Mohammadabad-e Nilchi, also known as Moḩammadābād, is a village in Aliabad Rural District, in the Central District of Taft County, Yazd Province, Iran. At the 2006 census, its population was 22, in 8 families.

References 

Populated places in Taft County